General Sir William Dillon Otter  (December 3, 1843 – May 6, 1929) was a professional Canadian soldier who became the first Canadian-born Chief of the General Staff, the head of the Canadian Militia.

Military career
Otter was born near Clinton, Canada West. His parents were Anna Louisa, née de la Hooke (1824–1907) and Alfred William Otter (1815–1866), both English immigrants who married in Ontario on 15 September 1842. He began his military career in the Non-Permanent Active Militia in Toronto in 1864. Captain William Otter was Adjutant of the Queen's Own Rifles of Toronto in 1866. He first saw combat with them at the Battle of Ridgeway during the Fenian Raids.

He joined the Permanent Force as an infantry officer when Canada established its own professional infantry unit in 1883. On May 2, 1885, he led a Canadian force of more than 300 in the Battle of Cut Knife against a Cree and Assiniboine camp defended by Poundmaker and Fine-Day. Otter's tactics were ineffective against the defending warriors. 

He was appointed as the first commanding officer of the Royal Canadian Regiment of Infantry in 1893.

During the Second Boer War, Otter, by then a lieutenant colonel, commanded the 2nd (Special Service) Battalion of The Royal Canadian Regiment of Infantry in South Africa, where they were considered by many British officers to be the best infantry battalion in the country.  Otter played an important part in the Battle of Paardeberg. 

He became the first Canadian-born officer to command Canada's military in 1908, and retired in 1910 as a major general. In 1922 he was the second Canadian, after Sir Arthur Currie, to be appointed a full general. Otter had the reputation of being something of a martinet – due mainly to his desire that the young Canadian Army should not show up badly when compared to British troops.

He wrote The Guide: A Manual for the Canadian Militia (Infantry) Embracing the Interior Economy, Duties, Discipline, Drills and Parades, Dress, Books, and Correspondence of a Battalion with Regulations for Marches, Transport & Encampment, Also Forms & Bugle Calls in 1914, which includes sections on discipline, courts martial, offences, complaints, and defaulters.

During the First World War he came out of retirement to command operations for the internment of enemy nationals resident in Canada.

Otter headed the Otter Commission. The Otter Commission was tasked to establish links of perpetuation from the units of Canadian Expeditionary Force back to the institutionally separate units of the Canadian Militia in the years following the First World War.  This establishment of perpetuation, based primarily on geographical connections through original recruiting areas of the CEF battalions, provided a basis by which the achievements and battle honours of the CEF units transferred back to the units of the standing Militia.  Without this work of the Otter Commission the CEF and its achievements would have had no continuance with existing units of the Canadian Army today.

General Sir William Otter died on 6 May 1929.

Freemason
Otter was initiated into the Ionic Lodge of Freemasonry in Toronto in February 1869.  He became Worshipful Master in 1873.

Legacy

Otter Squadron, composed of University Training Plan Non Commissioned Member (UTPNCM) Officer Cadets, at the Royal Military College of Canada in Kingston, Ontario, was named in his honour and the Cadet Squadron Leader of Otter Squadron is permitted to carry his sword on graduation parade.

Family connections
Otter was the grandfather of Canadian Military historian Desmond Morton.

Honours

Ribbon bar:

Order of the Bath - Knight Commander 
Royal Victorian Order - Commander
Canada General Service Medal - Bars for 1866 and 1870 
North West Canada Medal - Bar for Saskatchewan 
Queen's South Africa Medal - Bars for Johannesburg, Paardeberg, Driefontein, and Cape Colony
King Edward VII Coronation Medal
Volunteer Officers' Decoration

References

Further reading
 Desmond Morton, The Canadian General Sir William Otter, Toronto: Hakkert, 1974. Canadian War Museum historical publication
 Commander Chas. N. Robinson R.N., Celebrities of the Army, London: George Newnes Limited, 1900.
 Major-General Sir William D. Otter `The Guide: A Manual for the Canadian Militia (Infantry) Embracing the Interior Economy, Duties, Discipline, Drills and Parades, Dress, Books, and Correspondence of a Battalion with Regulations for Marches, Transport & Encampment, Also Forms & Bugle Calls` Toronto: Copp, Clark & Co. 1914

External links
Biography at the Dictionary of Canadian Biography Online
Information from civilisations.ca
Information on Otter and the Otter Committee at canadiansoldiers.com
Canada's 25 Most Renowned Military Leaders

1843 births
1929 deaths
Canadian military personnel from Ontario
Canadian generals of World War I
Canadian Knights Commander of the Order of the Bath
Canadian Knights Commander of the Order of St Michael and St George
Canadian Commanders of the Royal Victorian Order
People of the Fenian raids
People of the North-West Rebellion
Commanders of the Canadian Army
Royal Regiment of Canadian Artillery officers
Queen's Own Rifles of Canada officers
Royal Canadian Regiment officers
Canadian Militia officers
Royal Canadian Regiment